North Canton City School District is a public school district serving students in North Canton, Ohio, United States.

The district serves city of North Canton except for some small portions that are instead served by the Plain Local School District. However, this district also includes most of the southwestern quarter of Lake Township.

The district schools include an early childhood center serving preschool (Mary L Evens), two elementary schools serving grades K-2 (Clearmont, Northwood) and two intermediate schools serving grades 3–5 (Greentown, Orchard Hill). Students from grades 6-8 attend North Canton Middle School, and grades 9-12 are housed in Hoover High School.

The district's colors are orange and black, and the mascot is the Vikings (often shortened to "Vikes").

In 2023 two new schools are to open. North Canton Primary is to house all PK-2 students and North Canton Intermediate will house all 3-5 students. The 5 schools that will no longer be needed, will be demolished or used for other purposes.

References

External links
 Official Site

School districts in Stark County, Ohio